Phostria albescentalis is a moth in the family Crambidae. It was described by George Hampson in 1918. It is found in the Democratic Republic of the Congo (North Kivu), Kenya and Mozambique.

The inner margin of the forewings has a small black spot at its extremity and there is a curved blackish antemedial line, as well as a small black spot in the middle of the cell and an elliptical discoidal spot. The postmedial line is blackish and there is a slight blackish terminal line. The basal half of the hindwings is white and the terminal half is whitish suffused with pale grey brown. There is a small oblique black discoidal spot and a diffused dark postmedial line, as well as an indistinct diffused curved brown subterminal line and a black terminal line.

References

Phostria
Moths described in 1918
Moths of Africa